Decatur Township is one of the nine townships in Marion County, Indiana, United States, and part of the consolidated city of Indianapolis. As of the 2010 census, it had a population of 32,388. Located in the southwest corner of the county, the township is home to the Indianapolis International Airport main terminal. It is one of the most rural sections of the county, but has seen many new residential and commercial developments. AmeriPlex, one of the largest industrial parks in Indiana, is in Decatur Township. Through the White River, Decatur and Perry townships share the only water boundary among Marion County's townships.

Population
Decatur Township was home to 24,726 residents in the 2000 census. As of the 2010 census, the population had increased to 32,388. By the 2020 census it had reached 36,951. The almost 50% increase between 2000 and 2020 census tabulations ranks Decatur Township second among Marion County's nine townships for population growth.

History
The township was settled in the 1820s by mostly Quakers from South Carolina. They settled along the banks of the White River. West Newton is a small Quaker-settled town inside the township. Many of today's residents can trace their lineages back to these early settlers.

Decatur Township was named for Stephen Decatur.

Key information
The township is the home of the Decatur Township Civic Council and the Metropolitan School District of Decatur Township. The Indianapolis Challenger Center calls Decatur Township home.

Camby (also sometimes called "West Union Station") is a neighborhood in western Decatur Township that also extends into neighboring Hendricks and Morgan counties, centered along Camby Road near State Road 67. Camby has a post office with the ZIP code of 46113.

Township elected officials
U.S. Congress, District 7: André Carson (D)
Indiana House, District 91: Robert Behning (R)
Indiana Senate, District 35: R. Michael Young (R)
Mayor: Joe Hogsett (D)
City-County Council, District 20: Josh Bain (R)
City-County Council, District 22: Jared Evans (D)
Trustee: Jason Holliday (R)
Small Claims Court Judge: Myron Hockman (R)
Constable: Darrell McGaha (R)
Township Board: District 1, Cindy Freund (R); District 2, Josh Masquelier (R); District 3, Neal Mack (R); District 4, Luke Schmitt (R); District 5, David Knight (R)
School Board: Judy Collins, Larry Taylor, Dale Henson, Jimmy Ray, Estella Vandeventer

Geography

Municipalities 
 Indianapolis (partial)

Communities 
 West Newton

References

External links

 Indiana Township Association
 United Township Association of Indiana
 Decatur Township Fire Department

Townships in Marion County, Indiana
Geography of Indianapolis
Townships in Indiana
Populated places established in the 1820s
1820s establishments in Indiana